Ordnance Factory Itarsi is a census town in Narmadapuram district in the Indian state of Madhya Pradesh.

Demographics
 India census, Ordnance Factory Itarsi had a population of 10,265. Males constitute 53% of the population and females 47%. Ordnance Factory Itarsi has an average literacy rate of 86%, higher than the national average of 59.5%: male literacy is 92%, and female literacy is 77%. In Ordnance Factory Itarsi, 7% of the population is under 6 years of age.

References

Cities and towns in Narmadapuram district
Narmadapuram